Suzanne Collins (born August 10, 1962) is an American author and television writer. She is best known as the author of the young adult dystopian book series The Hunger Games.

Early life
Suzanne Collins was born on August 10, 1962, in Hartford, Connecticut, to Jane Brady Collins (born 1931) and Lieutenant Colonel Michael John Collins (1931–2003), a U.S. Air Force officer who served in the Korean and the Vietnam War. She is the youngest of four children, who include Kathryn (born 1957), Andrew (born 1958), and Joan (born 1960). As the daughter of a military officer, she and her family were constantly moving. She spent her childhood in the eastern United States.

Collins graduated from the Alabama School of Fine Arts in Birmingham in 1980 as a Theater Arts major. She completed her bachelor of arts degree from Indiana University Bloomington in 1985 with a double major in theater and telecommunications. In 1989, Collins earned her Master of Fine Arts in dramatic writing from the New York University Tisch School of the Arts.

Career
Suzanne Collins began her career in 1991 as a writer for children's television shows. She worked on several shows for Nickelodeon, including Clarissa Explains It All, The Mystery Files of Shelby Woo, Little Bear, Oswald and Wow! Wow! Wubbzy!. She did not write the children's book Little Bear, which is sometimes mistaken as her own book. She was also the head writer for Scholastic Entertainment's Clifford's Puppy Days. She received a Writers Guild of America nomination in animation for co-writing the critically acclaimed Christmas special, Santa, Baby! After meeting children's author James Proimos while working on the Kids' WB show Generation O!, Collins felt inspired to write children's books herself. Her inspiration for Gregor the Overlander, the first book of The New York Times best-selling series The Underland Chronicles, came from Alice in Wonderland, when she was thinking about how one was more likely to fall down a manhole than a rabbit hole, and would find something other than a tea party.  Between 2003 and 2007 she wrote the five books of the Underland Chronicles: Gregor the Overlander, Gregor and the Prophecy of Bane, Gregor and the Curse of the Warmbloods, Gregor and the Marks of Secret, and Gregor and the Code of Claw. During that time, Collins also wrote a rhyming picture book, When Charlie McButton Lost Power (2005), illustrated by Mike Lester.

In September 2008, Scholastic Press released The Hunger Games, the first book of a trilogy by Collins. The Hunger Games was partly inspired by the Greek myth of Theseus and the Minotaur. Another inspiration was her father's career in the Air Force, which gave her insight to poverty, starvation, and the effects of war. The trilogy's second book, Catching Fire, was released in September 2009, and its third book, Mockingjay, was released on August 24, 2010. Within 14 months, 1.5 million copies of the first two Hunger Games books were printed in North America alone. The Hunger Games was on The New York Times Best Seller list for more than 60 weeks in a row. Lions Gate Entertainment acquired worldwide distribution rights to a film adaptation of The Hunger Games, produced by Nina Jacobson's Color Force production company. Collins adapted the novel for film herself. Directed by Gary Ross, filming began in late spring 2011, with Jennifer Lawrence portraying main character Katniss Everdeen. Josh Hutcherson played Peeta Mellark and Liam Hemsworth played Gale Hawthorne. The subsequent two novels were adapted into films as well, with the latter book split into two cinematic installments, for a total of four films representing the three books. As a result of the popularity of The Hunger Games books, Collins was named one of Time magazine's most influential people of 2010. In March 2012, Amazon announced that she had become the best-selling Kindle author of all time. Amazon also revealed that Collins had written 29 of the 100 most highlighted passages in Kindle ebooks—and on a separate Amazon list of recently highlighted passages, she had written 17 of the top 20. On June 17, 2019, Collins announced that a prequel to The Hunger Games would be released on May 19, 2020. The premise is based on the life of future President Coriolanus Snow, 64 years before the events of The Hunger Games trilogy. On October 4, 2019 the title was revealed to be The Ballad of Songbirds and Snakes.

Awards
 2011 – California Young Reader Medal
 Publishers Weeklys Best Books of the Year: Children's Fiction
 An American Library Association Top 10 Best Books For Young Adult Selection
 An ALA Notable Children's Book
 2008 CYBIL Award – Fantasy and Science Fiction
 KIRKUS Best Young Adult Book of 2008
 A Horn Book Fanfare
 School Library Journal Best Books of 2008
 A Book List Editor's Choice, 2008
 NY Public Library 100 Titles for Reading and Sharing
 2004 NAIBA Children's Novel Award
 2006 ALSC Notable Children's Recording (audio version)
 2016 Authors Guild Award for Distinguished Service to the Literary Community (first time awarded to an author of young adult fiction)

Publications

The Underland Chronicles

 Gregor the Overlander (2003)
 Gregor and the Prophecy of Bane (2004)
 Gregor and the Curse of the Warmbloods (2005)
 Gregor and the Marks of Secret (2006)
 Gregor and the Code of Claw (2007)

The Hunger Games series

Original series
 The Hunger Games (2008)
 Catching Fire (2009)
 Mockingjay (2010)

Prequel
 The Ballad of Songbirds and Snakes (2020)

Other books

 Fire Proof: Shelby Woo #11 (1999)
 When Charlie McButton Lost Power (2005)
 Year of the Jungle (2013)

References

External links

 
 
 
 

 
1962 births
Living people
21st-century American novelists
21st-century American women writers
American children's writers
American science fiction writers
American women novelists
American writers of young adult literature
Indiana University Bloomington alumni
Writers from Birmingham, Alabama
People from Sandy Hook, Connecticut
Tisch School of the Arts alumni
American women children's writers
Women science fiction and fantasy writers
Women writers of young adult literature
Novelists from Alabama
Writers from Hartford, Connecticut
Writers of young adult science fiction
Novelists from Connecticut